True North Gallery (also known as The Music Gallery of Fine Art), founded in 2016 by Geoff and Brooke Kulawick, is an art museum and gallery in downtown Waterdown, Ontario, Canada. Dedicated to showcasing visual art by professional musicians, it claims to be the only art gallery of its kind. It is located at the head office of True North Records and Linus Entertainment. The gallery is privately owned and offers free admission.

History 

In 2015—seven years after purchasing True North Records from its original owner, Bernie Finkelstein—Geoff Kulawick moved the label's head office from Burlington to Waterdown, Ontario. Kulawick credits his wife Mabruka (Brooke), a visual artist, with the idea to use the new space as a place to display artwork by professional musicians. Brooke noted that some True North Records signees including Buffy Sainte-Marie and Murray McLauchlan were visual artists. Of the concept, Kulawick claimed, "The more research I did, the more it sounded like something brilliant that nobody else is doing."

The gallery has hosted open house events featuring musicians/artists, including Buffy Sainte-Marie and Murray McLauchlan (at the grand opening in March 2016), Greg Smith and Jon Langford (May 2016), Louie Pérez (January 2017), and Joe Crookston (January 2018).

While pieces such as limited-edition prints by John Lennon and a charcoal self-portrait by David Bowie remain part of the Kulawicks' private collection, many originals are on consignment from the artists.

See also
 Waterdown, Ontario
 True North Records
 Linus Entertainment

References

External links

Art museums and galleries in Ontario
Buildings and structures in Hamilton, Ontario
Arts centres in Canada
Culture of Hamilton, Ontario
2016 establishments in Ontario